Hope-Johnstone is a surname. Notable people with the surname include:
James Hope-Johnstone, 3rd Earl of Hopetoun (1741–1816), Scottish peer
John Hope-Johnstone (disambiguation), multiple people
Patrick Hope-Johnstone, 11th Earl of Annandale and Hartfell (born 1941), Scottish peer
Percy Wentworth Hope-Johnstone (1909–1983), de jure British peer and army soldier
William James Hope-Johnstone KCB (1798–1878), British navy commander

See also
Hope (surname)
Johnstone (surname)

Compound surnames
English-language surnames
Surnames of Scottish origin